The Man in the Fire (German: Der Mann im Feuer) is a 1926 German silent film directed by Erich Waschneck and starring Helga Thomas, Olga Tschechowa and Henry Stuart. It was shot at the Weissensee Studios in Berlin. The film's sets were designed by Botho Hoefer. It was released in the United States under the alternative title of When Duty Calls.

Cast
 Rudolf Rittner as Feuerwehrmann Johann Michael 
 Helga Thomas as Tochter Lore Michel  
 Olga Tschechowa as Diva Romola  
 Henry Stuart as Hellmuth Frank  
 Kurt Vespermann as Karl Winter  
 Jakob Tiedtke as Freund der Diva

References

Bibliography
 Hans-Michael Bock and Tim Bergfelder. The Concise Cinegraph: An Encyclopedia of German Cinema. Berghahn Books.

External links

1926 films
Films of the Weimar Republic
German silent feature films
Films directed by Erich Waschneck
Films about firefighting
UFA GmbH films
Films produced by Erich Pommer
German black-and-white films
Films shot at Weissensee Studios